Jan Zapletal (born August 21, 1986) is a Czech professional ice hockey  player who played in the Czech Extraliga with VHK Vsetín. He was selected by the Tampa Bay Lightning in the 7th round (209th overall) of the 2004 NHL Entry Draft.

Career statistics

External links

1986 births
Living people
Czech ice hockey defencemen
Czech expatriate ice hockey players in Canada
SHK Hodonín players
HC Olomouc players
KLH Vajgar Jindřichův Hradec players
People from Hodonín
Regina Pats players
Tampa Bay Lightning draft picks
VHK Vsetín players
Sportspeople from the South Moravian Region